The 2017 West Coast Conference women's basketball tournament was held March 2–7, 2017, at Orleans Arena in the Las Vegas Valley community of Paradise, Nevada. Seeds were determined solely on conference record. Regular-season champion Gonzaga added the tournament crown to its résumé, earning the conference's automatic bid to the 2017 NCAA Division I women's basketball tournament.

Seeds
WCC tiebreaker procedures went as follows:
 Head-to-head
 Record against the top-seeded team(s) not involved in the tie, going down through the seedings as needed
 Higher RPI

* Overall record at end of regular season.

Schedule

Bracket and Scores
 All BYUtv games were simulcast online and streamed at TheW.tv.

Game Summaries

First round

#8 Pacific vs. #9 Pepperdine
Broadcasters: Spencer Linton & Kristen Kozlowski 
Series History: Pacific leads series 7–3

#7 San Diego vs. #10 Portland
Broadcasters: Spencer Linton & Kristen Kozlowski 
Series History: Series –

Quarterfinals

#3 St. Mary's vs. #6 Santa Clara
Broadcasters: Dave McCann & Blaine Fowler 
Series History: Series –

#4 San Francisco vs. #5 Loyola Marymount
Broadcasters: Dave McCann & Kristen Kozlowski
Series History: Series –

#1 Gonzaga vs. #9 Pacific
Broadcasters: Spencer Linton & Kristen Kozlowski
Series History: Series –

#2 BYU vs. #7 San Diego
Broadcasters: Spencer Linton & Kristen Kozlowski 
Series History: Series –

Semifinals

#1 Gonzaga vs. #4 San Francisco
Broadcasters: Spencer Linton & Kristen Kozlowski 
Series History: Series –

#2 BYU vs. #3 Saint Mary's
Broadcasters: Spencer Linton & Kristen Kozlowski
Series History: Series –

WCC Championship

#1 Gonzaga vs. #3 Saint Mary's
Broadcasters: Paul Sunderland & Mike Thibault
Series History: Series –

All-Tournament team

See also

 2016–17 NCAA Division I women's basketball season
 West Coast Conference men's basketball tournament
 2017 West Coast Conference men's basketball tournament
 West Coast Conference women's basketball tournament

Tournament
West Coast Conference women's basketball tournament
West Coast Conference women's basketball tournament
West Coast Conference women's basketball tournament
Basketball competitions in the Las Vegas Valley
College basketball tournaments in Nevada
Women's sports in Nevada
21st century in Las Vegas
College sports tournaments in Nevada